Siege of Tabriz (1908–1909) took place during the Persian Constitutional Revolution, when which forces affiliated with Mohammad Ali Shah, besieged Tabriz for 11 months to suppress the constitutionalists and preventing food and medicine from reaching the city. Eventually the siege ended with the intervention of Russian forces and the escape and dispersal of the constitutional leaders and mujahideen. This uprising is one of the most important and influential events in the Iranian constitutional movement.

Background 

Following the Majlis Bombardment on the orders of Mohammad Ali Shah, telegrams were sent to various cities, announcing the overthrow of the constitution, inviting everyone to follow the central government and the Shah. However, the constitutionalists of Tabriz, led by Sattar Khan and Baqir Khan, refused to submit to the Shah. The Shah, on the other hand, sent a large detachment of troops to Tabriz under the command of Abdul Majid Mirza.

Subsequently, clashes broke out between forces affiliated with Mohammad Ali Shah and the constitutionalists, the constitutionalists have succeeded in defeating state forces and pushed back Abdul Majid Mirza and his troops. Subsequently, government forces besieged Tabriz prevented supplies and supplies from reaching the city.

Famine 
As a result of the blockade, there was a severe famine as the people of Tabriz were forced to eat the leaves of desert trees and grass, and many of the residents of Tabriz starved to death.

However, the constitutionalists resisted for eleven months and tried to break the siege several times. For example, some of youths formed a group called Fowj Nejat, led by Howard Baskerville, an American teacher at Memorial School and attempted to break the siege on Shanb Ghazan, which failed and the result was the killing of this American teacher.

End of Siege 
As Russian troops entered Tabriz, Sattarkhan and Baqrokhan's position as Tabriz's constitutionalist leaders was threatened, until they were forced to seek refuge with the Ottoman Consulate along with a number of other constitutionalists.

References 

Persian Constitutional Revolution
History of Tabriz
1910s in Iran
Iran–Russia military relations